Elections were held to Swale Borough Council in England as part of the United Kingdom local elections on 2 May 2019.

Results summary

|-

Ward results

Abbey

Bobbing, Iwade & Lower Halstow

Borden & Grove Park

Boughton & Courtenay

Chalkwell

East Downs

Hartlip, Newington & Upchurch

Homewood

Kemsley

Milton Regis

Minster Cliffs

Murston

Priory

Queenborough & Halfway

Roman

Sheerness

Sheppey Central

Sheppey East

St. Ann's

Teynham & Lynsted

The Meads

Watling

West Downs

Woodstock

By-elections between 2019 and 2023

Sheerness
A by-election was held in Sheerness on 6 May 2021 after the death of Labour councillor Mark Ellen. The seat was gained for the Conservative Party by Oliver Marcus Eakin with a majority of 144 votes over Labour Party candidate Nicola Nelson.

Priory
A by-election was held in Priory Ward on 30 September 2021 after the resignation of Independent councillor Ben A Martin. The seat was gained for the Liberal Democrats by Michael Scott Henderson with a majority of 42 votes over Conservative Party candidate Andy Culham.

Changes between 2019 and 2023 

In October 2020, Cllr Denise Knights (Abbey) and Cllr Ben A Martin (Priory) resigned the Liberal Democrat whip and joined the Independent Group.

Labour councillor Mark Ellen (Sheerness) died suddenly on 18 February 2021. At the consequent by-election on 6 May 2021 the Conservative Party gained the seat. New councillor Oliver Eakin.

In May 2021, Cllr Padmini Nissanga (Sheppey East) left UKIP and joined Reform UK to become their candidate for the Sheppey seat at the 2021 Kent County Council election.

In July 2021, Cllr Richard Darby (Minster Cliffs) and Cllr Bill Tatton (Sheppey East) resigned the Swale Independents Alliance whip and formed a new group, 'Independents First'.

Independent councillor Ben A Martin (Priory) resigned his seat in August 2021. At the consequent by-election on 30 September 2021 the Liberal Democrats gained the seat. New councillor Michael Scott Henderson.

In March 2022, Cllr Peter MacDonald (Sheppey Central) resigned the Conservative whip and joined 'Independents First'.

In April 2022, Cllr Simon Fowle (Queenborough & Halfway) resigned the Conservative whip to sit as an Independent.

In September 2022, Cllr Steve Davey (Milton Regis) resigned the Labour whip and joined the Independent Group.

See also 
 Swale Borough Council elections

References

2019 English local elections
May 2019 events in the United Kingdom
2019
2010s in Kent